Fatma Girik (12 December 1942 – 24 January 2022) was a Turkish actress and politician. Together with Hülya Koçyiğit, Filiz Akın and Türkan Şoray, she was an icon for the golden age in Turkish cinematography and is regarded as one of the four most important actresses in Turkish cinema.

Biography
Girik was born in Istanbul on 12 December 1942. She graduated from Cağaloğlu Girls High School in the city. Her first appearance in front of the camera was as a walking lady in Günahkar Baba (Sinful Father) by Arşavir Alyanak.

After a stint in small parts, she landed the leading role in Leke (The Stain) by Seyfi Havaeri in 1958. Three years later, she became a respected movie star with her leading role in Ölüm Peşimizde (Death is Chasing Us) by Memduh Ün. She went on to star in over 180 films. Later on, she ventured into politics, becoming the mayor of the district of Şişli in Istanbul between 1989 and 1994.

Girik died in Istanbul from multi-organ failure due to pneumonia caused by COVID-19 on 24 January 2022, at the age of 79.

Filmography

Film

TV series

Awards
 2nd Antalya Golden Orange Film Festival 1965, Keşanlı Ali Destanı, Best Actress
 4th Antalya Golden Orange Film Festival 1967, Sürtüğün Kızı, Best Actress
 1st Adana Golden Boll Film Festival 1969, Ezo Gelin, Best Actress
 2nd Adana Golden Boll Film Festival 1970, Boş Beşik, Best Actress
 3rd Adana Golden Boll Film Festival 1971, Acı, Best Actress
 35th Antalya Golden Orange Film Festival 1998, Sürtüğün Kızı, Lifetime honorary award

References

External links
 
 Profile, kimkimdir.gen.tr

1942 births 
2022 deaths
20th-century Turkish actresses
Actresses from Istanbul
Best Actress Golden Orange Award winners
Best Actress Golden Boll Award winners
Golden Orange Life Achievement Award winners
Turkish film actresses
Turkish actor-politicians
Social Democratic Populist Party (Turkey) politicians
Deaths from the COVID-19 pandemic in Turkey
Deaths from multiple organ failure
Mayors of places in Turkey
20th-century Turkish women politicians
20th-century Turkish politicians
21st-century Turkish actresses